Swan Reach is a river port in South Australia 127 km north-east of Adelaide on the Murray River between Blanchetown and Mannum in South Australia. It is on the left bank of the river. The Swan Reach Ferry is a cable ferry crossing operated by the state government as part of the state's road network. Swan Reach, with all parts below Lock #1, is also one of the lowest parts of the river. It is currently (2009–2010) about 1.5 metres below its normal level.

History 
Swan Reach was first settled in the 1850s and was originally the largest of five sheep and cattle stations in the area. It soon became one of the first riverboat ports in South Australia and was a loading port for grain and wool.

Swan Reach Mission was established by the United Aborigines Mission (UAM) in 1926 to provide a Christian education to Aboriginal children. It was closed in 1946 due to frequent flooding of the area, and the UAM opened the Gerard Mission near Loxton. Some residents were transferred to the new mission, but some, including the parents of singer-songwriter Ruby Hunter, moved elsewhere for work. Children of the mission became part of the Stolen Generation, later provided with some compensation through the National Redress Scheme.

Around the town
Swan Reach has an area school, hotel and bottle shop, general store and post office, an op shop that opens Mondays to Fridays and Saturday mornings, and a fast food take-away shop near the ferry. The tourist boat Proud Mary and paddle-wheeler PS Murray Princess stop at the town once a week. There is a Lutheran church, with regular services, and a Lutheran pastor in residence. Anglican and Roman Catholic services are held monthly.  Tourism, agriculture and irrigated horticulture are the main industries, and there is a large almond processing plant 1.5 km from town on the Stott Highway.

River Murray International Dark Sky Reserve 

The Swan Reach Conservation Park lies in a  area which was named the nation's first, and the world's 15th International Dark sky reserve in October 2019, by the International Dark-Sky Association. The "dark sky" title refers to areas where the night sky has a high darkness rating and there are policy controls to ensure light pollution is kept to a minimum, with reserve status only given when both public and private residential land is included.

A multi-million-dollar joint project between Silentium Defence and the Western Sydney University to build a space domain awareness observatory to monitor satellites and other objects orbiting the earth was announced in June 2020. The Murray Mallee location and terrain of the land was considered ideal for the purpose.The Oculus passive radar observatory opened in December 2021.

The reserve's official name is the River Murray International Dark Sky Reserve.

See also
 List of crossings of the Murray River

Notes and references

External links
 Township of Swan Reach South Australia - swanreach.sa.au
 Swan Reach Area School
 Swan Reach Lutheran Parish

Towns in South Australia
Tourist attractions in South Australia
Populated places on the Murray River
International Dark Sky Reserves